Fencing at the 1951 Pan American Games in Buenos Aires, Argentina.


Results

Men's events

Women's events

References
 Pan American Games Results Fencing
 
  .

1951
Events at the 1951 Pan American Games
Pan American Games
1951 Pan American Games